The Pearsons Hall of Science was built in 1892 on the campus of Beloit College in Beloit, Wisconsin. It was added to the National Register of Historic Places in 1980 because it was designed by the firm of Daniel Burnham and because it marks an expansion of the science curriculum at the college.

History
The hall was built using funds donated by and named after Dr. D. K. Pearsons, a Quaker man from Pawnee, Illinois. Pearsons had once passed through Beloit on the way to Janesville, Wisconsin and saw the college being built. He was so affected by the sight that it inspired him to donate $100,000 to the school nearly forty years later. The hall was used as the school's science center until 1963.

Currently, the hall houses meeting rooms, dining facilities, student lounges, student service offices, a mailroom, a radio station, student government and publication offices. It was officially renamed the Jeffris-Wood Campus Center, named after attorney and business man Pierpont J. E. Wood and his wife, Helen Jeffris Wood. On campus, it is still generally referred to as Pearsons Hall.

Renovations 
Renovations to wiring, plumbing, flooring, ventilation, and equipment occurred in 1931. This renovation also saw the addition of a skylight.  A second renovation in 1985 by architect Edward Ware was completed and the building was rededicated as the Jeffris-Wood Campus Center. The bookstore was moved from Smith building to Jeffris-Wood Campus Center after this renovation.

References

Beloit College
Buildings and structures in Beloit, Wisconsin
Schools in Rock County, Wisconsin
University and college buildings on the National Register of Historic Places in Wisconsin
Burnham and Root buildings
Romanesque Revival architecture in Wisconsin
School buildings completed in 1893
National Register of Historic Places in Rock County, Wisconsin
1893 establishments in Wisconsin